McNally is a crater that is located to the north-northwest of the much larger crater Fersman, on the far side of Moon. This is a worn crater with a rounded rim edge that is marked by many tiny impacts. Smaller, cup-shaped impacts cut through the rim along the southeastern and northern edges. There is a small craterlet along the base of the southeastern inner wall. The interior floor is otherwise relatively featureless. The crater is named after the Jesuit astronomer and Catholic priest Paul A. McNally.

Satellite craters
By convention these features are identified on lunar maps by placing the letter on the side of the crater midpoint that is closest to McNally.

References

 
 
 
 
 
 
 
 
 
 
 
 

Impact craters on the Moon